"Ámame" ("Love Me") is a song by American singer Selena, taken from her third studio album, Entre a Mi Mundo (1992). Selena and Chris Pérez began secretly dating after Pérez rejoined Selena y Los Dinos in the summer of 1991, despite her father's objections. The song was written by Selena, penned about her feelings toward Pérez while hiding their relationship from their family. Pete Astudillo provided songwriting assistance for the song, while A. B. Quintanilla handled production. It was released as the fourth and final single from the album in April 1993.

"Ámame" is a dance-pop and disco song, inspired by Selena and A. B.'s desire to record pop music compositions, with lyrics of a woman yearning for the man she loves to love her. It received a positive response from music critics who praised it for displaying Selena's throaty vocals and noted the dance-pop style. The song peaked at number 27 on the US Billboard Hot Latin Songs chart. Selena's writing of the song was dramatized by Christian Serratos in the Netflix two-part limited drama, Selena: The Series (2020).

Background and release 
In 1988, Chris Pérez replaced Roger Garcia as the guitarist of Selena y Los Dinos. Pérez became a fan of the group after listening to their album Preciosa (1988). He specifically became a fan of A. B. Quintanilla's production of the music. Pérez decided to join Selena y Los Dinos and abandoned his recently-formed rock band. Sometime in 1990, Pérez left Selena y Los Dinos and the group hired Joe Ortega. Upon the request of his wife, Ortega quit Selena y Los Dinos after getting married. Pérez rejoined the group in the summer of 1991. He began dating lead singer Selena in secret, despite her father's objections. Selena wrote "Ámame" in response to her feelings for Pérez while hiding their relationship from their family. She requested writing assistance from her backup dancer and singer Pete Astudillo. In a 1996 article, biographer Joe Nick Patoski erroneously wrote in the Austin American-Statesman that "Ámame" was Selena's first songwriting credit. The singer had previously wrote, "My Love" for her debut studio album with EMI Latin Selena (1989). Selena's father and manager of the group Abraham Quintanilla recalled that the singer "poured every ounce of energy" when she recorded "Ámame". The song was produced by A. B. for the group's third studio album Entre a Mi Mundo (1992). Abraham called it one of Selena and A. B.'s "pop inclinations".

The song was released as the fourth and final single from Entre a Mi Mundo in April 1993. Writing for The Monitor, Vilma Maldonado recalled "Ámame" blasting on radio stations across Texas.

Music, lyrics, and reception 
Suzette Fernandez for Billboard magazine, called "Ámame" a disco song that contains lyrics of a woman's desire for the man she loves to love her. Writing for the Houston Chronicle, Joey Guerra referred to it as a dance-pop song that features Selena's "rich, throaty vocals", which displayed a different "side of Selena." Also from Billboard, Jessica Roiz considered Selena's live performance of the song on Telemundo's music show Club Telemundo in 1993 to be one of her best live televised performances of her career. After a string of musicians covered songs by Selena at their RodeoHouston concerts, Guerra suggested that Brendon Urie of Panic! At the Disco, who had an upcoming performance at the venue, could cover "Ámame". Guerra suggested that Urie could "bring the bombast" to "Ámame", a "dance-pop anthem", and believed his vocals and the production of the song "would send it into the heavens".

Upon its radio release, "Ámame" debuted at number nine on the indie Tejano Singles chart for Texas on the week ending April 8, 1993. It debuted at number 40 on the US Billboard Hot Latin Songs chart on the week ending April 24, 1993. "Ámame" peaked at number 27 on the Hot Latin Songs chart in the week ending May 22, 1993. The recording was the third-highest charting Tejano single on the Hot Latin Songs chart for the week, following La Mafia's chart-topper "Me Estoy Enamorado" and Mazz "Que Sera?" at number 17.

Selena's writing of "Ámame" was dramatized in Netflix's two-part limited drama Selena: The Series (2020–21). Christian Serratos portrayed Selena opposite Jesse Posey as Pérez. In the ninth episode of the first part of the series, Abraham rehires a bodyguard for Selena after one of her fans grabbed her during a physical altercation in a club she was performing in. Selena reacts by punching the concert-goer in order to set herself free from him. Because of the proximity of her bodyguard, Selena deliberately avoids Pérez for fear that he might tell her father about them dating. Selena's behavior upsets Pérez, who suspects that their relationship is over. After Pérez confronts Selena about his suspicions, the singer spends the night writing about her feelings towards him and asks Astudillo (Julio Macias) to turn "Ámame" ("Love Me") into a song. After Selena's live performance of the song, Pérez tells her "I do, te amo (love you)".

Credits and personnel 
Credits are adapted from the liner notes of Entre a Mi Mundo.

 Selena – vocals, songwriter
 A. B. Quintanilla – producer, arranger, mixing
 Pete Astudillo – songwriter
 Brian "Red" Moore – engineer, mix engineer

 Ricky Vela – keyboards
 Joe Ojeda – keyboards
 Chris Pérez – guitar
 Suzette Quintanilla – drums

Chart performance

References

Works cited

External links 
 

1993 songs
1993 singles
Selena songs
Songs written by Selena
Songs written by Pete Astudillo
Song recordings produced by A. B. Quintanilla
Spanish-language songs
American disco songs
Latin pop songs
EMI Latin singles
Dance-pop songs